Avdyusha may refer to:
Avdyusha, a diminutive of the Russian male first name Avdey
Avdyusha, a diminutive of the Russian male first name Avdiky
Avdyusha, a diminutive of the Russian male first name Avdon